A Bibliographical Guide to the Law of the United Kingdom, the Channel Islands, and the Isle of Man is a bibliography of law. It was published by the Institute of Advanced Legal Studies of the University of London. The first edition was edited by Frederick Henry Lawson and H K Drake. It was published in 1956. It is "most comprehensive" and of "high merit and painstaking efficiency". The second edition was edited by A G Chloros and published in 1973. It is "useful".

References
A Bibliographical Guide to the Law of the United Kingdom, the Channel Islands, and the Isle of Man. University of London: Institute of Advanced Legal Studies. 1956.
Wolfram Müller-Freienfels. Zeitschrift für ausländisches und internationales Privatrecht 23. Jahrg., H. 2 (1958), pp. 352–353. JSTOR.
(1975) 6 New Zealand Universities Law Review 95 Google Books
National Library of Australia.

Legal bibliographies
1956 non-fiction books